WFIA may refer to:

WFIA (AM), a radio station (900 AM) licensed to Louisville, Kentucky, United States
WFIA-FM, a radio station (94.7 FM) licensed to New Albany, Indiana, United States